The Porsche 934 was a racing version of the Porsche 911 Turbo, prepared to FIA Group 4 rules, similar to the Porsche 935 which was prepared to FIA Group 5 rules.

History

The Porsche 934 was introduced for the 1976 racing season. It was manufactured for two years, 1976 and 1977, with 31 total being built. Toine Hezemans drove this car to victory at the European GT Championship, while in the U.S., with George Follmer at the wheel, it also became the Trans-Am champion. It continued to win races throughout the late 1970s.

The 934 was essential in building the Porsche 934/5, a combination of the 934 chassis and engine with the 935 wheels, tires and rear wing configuration. 

The 934 as well as the 935 were raced in the Deutsche Rennsport Meisterschaft in a distinctive orange "Jägermeister" livery.

Alan Hamilton the Australian Porsche distributor at the time owned one of these cars and competed and won the 1977 Australian Sports Car Championship, and in 1980 the same car won the title with Allan Moffat behind the wheel.

Details

The 934 has a top speed approaching 190 mph (approximately 300 km/h) and has a zero to  time of 3.9 seconds.  It was one of the last designs to incorporate all the distinctive stylings of the original 911s, with only minor bodywork taken from the 911 Turbo, to include GRP (glass-reinforced plastic) wheelarch extensions, doors, engine lid and boot.

The car came in a regular trim, or a racing trim (also called "Group 4 trim").
Regular trim:
 
 Electric windows and door trim
 120 liter fuel tank, or 31.7 US gallons.
  3-litre, flat-six engine  (in 1977, modifications took it to 550 bhp)

The racing trim was a modified regular trim to meet with the FIA rules, most notably it added  of weight, so that it complied with the minimum weight requirement of Group 4.

References

External links
 Porsche official site

Sports racing cars
934
Cars powered by boxer engines